Dr. Dawson House is a historic home located at Milford, Sussex County, Delaware.  It was built in the mid-19th century, and is a two-story, five bay, frame building with a steep gable roof with cross gable and lancet windows in the Gothic Revival style. It has a one-story side wing and two-story rear wing.  A porch covers the middle three bays on the main house. It was originally built as two separate, but neighboring, structures that were joined at an unknown date. Dr. Dawson used part of the house as an office.

It was added to the National Register of Historic Places in 1983.

References

Houses on the National Register of Historic Places in Delaware
Gothic Revival architecture in Delaware
Houses in Milford, Delaware
Houses in Sussex County, Delaware
National Register of Historic Places in Sussex County, Delaware